Dimi may refer to:

Dymi, Achaea, a municipal unit in Achaea, Greece
Dimi, a type of Georgian wine
Dimi, short for the given names Dimitri (disambiguation), Dimitrios or Dimitra (disambiguation)
Dimi (metric prefix), obsolete non-SI metric prefix for 10−4 (symbol is dm)
DIMI (music synthesizer) an early music synthesizer created by Erkki Kurenniemi